Rowland Park is a  public park in the Eastern Suburbs of Sydney, New South Wales, Australia. 

Rowland Park is located in the heritage suburb of Daceyville.

Features

Rowland Park is a mixed-use public park, and has a playground, outdoor gym, cricket pitches, sports fields, change rooms and public toilets.

History

Rowland Park was formally created as a public recreation reserve in 1927, and is named after the namesake of Daceyville, John Rowland Dacey.

References

External links
  [CC-By-SA]
  

Parks in Sydney
Daceyville